Havilland Hall is the largest privately owned estate on the island of Guernsey, and lies close to Saint Peter Port. 

The current house was built in 1830 for Lt Col Thomas de Havilland.

It is home to the British property developer David Rowland, and in 2005, Prince Andrew unveiled a life-size bronze statue there of Rowland smoking a cigar in a "vaguely Churchillian pose".

References

External links
https://www.priaulxlibrary.co.uk/articles/article/autobiography-thomas-fiott-de-havilland-engineer-and-architect

Buildings and structures in Saint Peter Port